Humphrey Butler, 1st Earl of Lanesborough (c. 1700 – 11 April 1768) was an Irish politician.

Butler was appointed High Sheriff for County Cavan in 1727 and High Sheriff of Westmeath in 1728. Between 1725 and 1736, he sat as a Member of Parliament (MP) for Belturbet in the Irish House of Commons.

When the Grand Lodge of Ireland was established in c. 1723, he was appointed Deputy Grand Master.

Butler was awarded the honorary degree of LL.D. by Trinity College, Dublin.

He married Mary, the daughter of Richard Berry. He was succeeded by his son, Brinsley, who was also Deputy Grand Master from 1753 to 1756 and elected Grand Master for 1757.

Arms

References

The Corporation of the Borough of Belturbet

1700s births
1768 deaths
Irish MPs 1715–1727
Irish MPs 1727–1760
Members of the Parliament of Ireland (pre-1801) for County Cavan constituencies
High Sheriffs of Cavan
High Sheriffs of County Westmeath
1